Ewell Goldyn Rhambo, known as Bo Rhambo, (September 21, 1923 in Austin, Texas – November 24, 1988 in Los Angeles, California) was an American trumpeter and tenor saxophonist.

Originally a trumpeter, he organized his band playing local dances and parties. He then went on to play  tenor saxophone. In 1952, he played with Joe Houston, then in 1953 recorded with Joe Liggins. In the 1950s, he led a trio with the pianist-organist Teddy Woods and drummer Bobby Pittman, recording for Cash Records then for Imperial in 1959-60.

Rhambo performed at the famed twelfth Cavalcade of Jazz held at Wrigley Field in Los Angeles which was produced by Leon Hefflin, Sr. on September 2, 1956. Also performing that day were Dinah Washington, The Mel Williams Dots, Julie Stevens, Little Richard, Chuck Higgin's Orchestra, Willie Hayden & Five Black Birds, The Premiers, Gerald Wilson and His 20-Pc. Recording Orchestra and Jerry Gray and his Orchestra.  He came back to perform at the final fourteenth Cavalcade of Jazz which was held at the Shrine Auditorium on August 3, 1958. Also performing that same day were Ray Charles with The Cookies and Ann Fisher, Ernie Freeman and his Band, Little Willie John, Sam Cooke, The Clark Kids and Sammy Davis Jr. who was there to crown the queen.

In 1978, he played on a Joe Houston recording session (Kicking Back on Big Town 1004).

Discography
Diane (Imperial)
Enchanted Evening (Imperial)
Tender Moments (Imperial)

Sources
 The Aladdin/Imperial Labels: A Discography (Michel Ruppli, 1991)

References

American jazz trumpeters
American male trumpeters
American jazz saxophonists
American male saxophonists
Swing trumpeters
Mainstream jazz saxophonists
Imperial Records artists
1988 deaths
Musicians from Austin, Texas
1923 births
20th-century American saxophonists
20th-century trumpeters
Jazz musicians from Texas
20th-century American male musicians
American male jazz musicians